Bridge to Nowhere is a 1986 New Zealand horror/thriller film directed and co-written by Ian Mune, and produced by Larry Parr. It centers on a group of teenagers who must fight for survival after coming across a mysterious hermit while on a camping trip.

Plot

During what was meant to be a fun-filled camping trip, a group of teenagers meet a mysterious hermit who lives on the other side of a nearby bridge. As they set up camp, it becomes apparent that the man is definitely not happy to see them.

Cast
 Matthew Hunter as Carl
 Margaret Umbers as Tanya
 Shelly Luxford as Julia
 Stephen Judd as Gray
 Philip Gordon as Leon
 Bruno Lawrence as Mac

Production

Bridge to Nowhere was directed by New Zealand filmmaker Ian Mune, who also co-wrote the film's script.

References

External links
 
 
 
 

1986 films
1980s adventure films
1986 horror films
1986 thriller films
1986 drama films
Films shot in New Zealand
New Zealand horror films
New Zealand thriller films
1980s English-language films
Films directed by Ian Mune